Churguy-ool Namgaevich Khomushku (10 May 1918 – 10 July 1978) was an officer in the Red Army and a recipient of the title Hero of the Soviet Union.

Early life
Khomushku was born on 1918 in the Khondelen village, to a family of peasants. He graduated from six classes in school and later became a cattle breeder at a collective farm. In 1936, Khomushku  was drafted into the ranks of the Tuvan People's Revolutionary Army. It was there that he became a member of the Tuvan People's Revolutionary Party.

After serving in the army, he became a chauffeur. And in 1941, he was awarded the Certificate of Honor from the Little Khural of the Republic.

World War II
In June 1941, following the start of Operation Barbarossa, the Tuvan People's Republic entered the war on the side of the Soviet Union. Khomushku submitted an application for sending him to the front as a volunteer, and his request was granted. On May 20, 1943, Khomushku, as part of the first group of volunteers from the Tuvan People's Republic, went to the front. For some time, Tuvan volunteers underwent military training in the city of Gorky in Russian SFSR. In February 1944, the Tuvan volunteers were assigned to the 25th Separate Tank Regiment. The regiment became part of the 52nd Army of the 2nd Ukrainian Front.

In March 1944, the regiment took part in the Dnieper–Carpathian Offensive. On March 5, 1944, during a breakthrough of the German defenses near the villages of Ryzhanovka and Kobilyaki in the Cherkasy Oblast at Reichskommissariat Ukraine, the tank driven by Khomushku, burst into the enemy's location at top speed. With fire and caterpillars, the tanks destroyed the German firing points and manpower. Within two hours, together with his crew, Khomushku killed 35 enemy soldiers, and destroyed three anti-tank guns, seven machine guns and two mortars. When the tank commander was wounded, Khomushku took over command of the tank.

A few days later, near the city of Uman, three tanks, among which was of Khomushku, captured 24 German aircraft, 80 vehicles, and captured up to a hundred enemy soldiers and officers. This opened the way for further offensive. The 25th Separate Tank Regiment took part in battles that liberated Moldova, and fought in Romania and Hungary. His unit celebrated Victory Day in Czechoslovakia.

By the decree of the Presidium of the Supreme Soviet of the USSR dated March 24, 1945, Junior Lieutenant Khomushku was awarded the title of Hero of the Soviet Union with the Order of Lenin and the Gold Star medal.

Later life
After returning to his native Tuva after the war, he actively participated in creative work, making contributions to the patriotic education of youth. From 1948, Khomushku was is in the reserve. He was elected a deputy of the Supreme Soviet of the USSR from the village of Bert-Dag in the Tes-Khemsky district of Tuvan ASSR. He died on 10 July 1978, at the age of 60.

Awards and honours

One of the streets of Kyzyl is named after Khomushku. A bust of him is installed on the square near the obelisk to the fallen soldiers, at the entrance to the city park in Kyzyl. In 2005, to mark the 60th anniversary of the victory in the Great Patriotic War, a Yakovlev Yak-42 of Interavia Airlines with tail number RA 42429, was named in his honor.

References

1918 births
1978 deaths
Heroes of the Soviet Union
Recipients of the Order of Lenin
People from Tuva
People from Yeniseysk Governorate
Tuvan people